The Vancouver Area Network of Drug Users or VANDU is a not-for-profit organization and advocacy group based in Vancouver, British Columbia, Canada. The group believes that all drug users should have their own rights and freedoms. The group's members have been actively involved in lobbying for support of Insite, North America's first safe injection site, located in the Downtown Eastside of Vancouver. 

Its board of directors consists entirely of current and former drug addicts. It was co-founded by Ann Livingston and Bud Osborn. Livingston had previously established a short-lived injection site called "Back Alley" on Powell Street in 1995.

Background

VANDU was created in September 1997, to advocate for the delivery of health care services to drug users living in Vancouver who had been exposed to increasing rates of hepatitis C and HIV as a result of sharing needles, and to address risks to their health, such as drug overdose. It has operated an unauthorized drug consumption site and provided assisted illegal drug use for about four years until it was shut down in 2014. 

A few dozen people first met in Oppenheimer Park on 9 September 1997 in response to messages posted by Livingston on utility poles throughout the Downtown Eastside. The assembled group of people decided to form an organization, and adopted the name Vancouver Area Network of Drug Users a year later. One of the attendees was Donald MacPherson, who later became drug-policy coordinator for Vancouver municipal government, and who also established the Canadian Drug Policy Coalition. 

Membership grew to about 100 individuals in a few months, and eventually to over 2,000. The organization's membership is open to all individuals, but those elected to the board of directors must be current or former addicts, and votes at the organization's meetings may only be cast by current or former addicts.

Actions and services
Amongst the services offered by VANDU is a managed alcohol program. The organization also engages in local issues pertaining to Downtown Eastside area residents.

VANDU defends harm reduction services and supervised injection facilities. In recent years, VANDU has been engaging with the Drug Users Liberation Front (DULF) to provide "safe supply" services.

References

Further reading

External links
 VANDU - Official website

Addiction medicine
Addiction and substance abuse organizations
Downtown Eastside
Drug culture
Drug policy
Drug policy organizations
Drug-related deaths
Drug safety
Early warning systems
Harm reduction
Organizations based in Vancouver
Organizations established in 1997
Public health
Public health organizations
Vulnerable adults
Substance intoxication
Substance abuse
Substance abuse counselors